Frederick R. Weedon (1784–1857) was a contract surgeon to the U.S. Army during the Second Seminole War and was the  physician who attended to the ailing Seminole warriors Osceola and Uchee Billy after their capture, and was notorious for decapitating their heads after they died. Weedon was born in Maryland, moved to Alabama and then the Florida Territory where he was the first to receive a permit for land under the Armed Occupation Act of 1842 in Mosquito County (today that area is St. Lucie County).

Weedon was the son of Sarah Sands and William Weedon who served as a colonel during the American Revolutionary War. Weedon himself served in the U.S. Army during the War of 1812. His son, Hamilton Moore Weedon, followed in his father's footsteps and became a physician. He served in the Fourth Florida Infantry of the Confederate States Army and was later in charge of the Confederate hospital in Eufaula, Alabama during the American Civil War.

References

1784 births
1857 deaths
American people of the Seminole Wars
United States Army personnel of the War of 1812
American military doctors
Florida pioneers
People from Maryland
People from St. Lucie County, Florida